The British men's national inline hockey team that participates in the IIHF Inline Hockey World Championships is an independent body established to operate for the sole purpose of operating a team at the World Championships and developing talent for future entries.

History

The national team has won two gold medals in Division I, ranking 9th in the World in 2004, 2006 and narrowly missed out on promotion to the elite division of eight in 2007.

World Championship results by year
2003 – Finished 13th
2004 – Finished 9th – won Division I gold medal
2005 – Finished 12th – won Division I bronze medal
2006 – Finished 9th – won Division I gold medal
2007 – Finished 13th
2008 – Finished 10th – won Division I silver medal
2011 – Finished 9th – won Division I gold medal and gained promotion to Pool A
2012 – Finished 8th – 1st year in Pool A relegated to Div I
2013 – Finished 9th – won Division I gold medal and gained promotion to Pool A

External links
Team Great Britain Official Site
IIHF Official Site

Inline hockey in the United Kingdom
National inline hockey teams
Inline hockey